Perennial vegetables are vegetables that can live for more than two years. 

Some well known perennial vegetables from the temperate regions of the world include asparagus, artichoke and rhubarb. In the tropics, cassava and taro are grown as vegetables, and these plants can live many years. Some perennial plants are cultivated as annuals in order to minimise pest pressure (e.g., potato, Solanum tuberosum).

Perennial vegetables are an integral part of many cultural diets around the world, particularly in tropical agriculture. In contrast, temperate Eurasian cultures have relied on annual cereals (oats, barley, wheat) as dietary staples since antiquity.   Some examples of older temperate varieties include: seakale, skirret, sorrel, and Good King Henry.

List 
 Abelmoschus manihot, edible hibiscus
 Allium ampeloprasum, perennial leek
 Allium cepa aggregatum, potato onion
 Allium × proliferum, tree onion or walking onion
 Allium schoenprasum, chives
 Aralia cordata, udo
 Arracacia xanthorrhiza, arracacha
 Artocarpus altilis, breadfruit
 Asparagus officinalis, asparagus
 Atriplex halimus, saltbush
 Basella alba, Malabar spinach
 Beta vulgaris maritima, sea beet
 Blitum bonus-henricus, Good King Henry
 Brassica oleracea acephala varieties, tree collards or tree kale
 Brassica oleracea alboglabra, kai-lan
 Bunias orientalis, Turkish rocket
 Camassia spp., camas
 Canna edulis, achira
 Capparis spinosa, capers
 Capsicum baccatum, aji amarillo
 Capsicum pubescens, manzano chile
 Carica papaya, papaya
 Cicorium intybus, chicory
 Cnidoscolus chayamansa, chaya
 Coccinia grandis, ivy gourd or perennial cucumber
 Colocasia esculenta, taro
 Crambe maritima, sea kale
 Cynara cardunculus, cardoon
 Cynara scolymus, artichoke
 Dioscorea bulbifera, air potato
 Helianthus tuberosus, Jerusalem artichoke
 Ipomoea batatas, sweet potato
 Lablab purpureus, hyacinth bean
 Manihot esculenta, cassava
 Nasturtium officinale, water cress
 Nelumbo nucifera, lotus
 Oxalis tuberosa, oca
 Phaseolus coccineus, runner bean
 Plantago coronopus, minutina
 Rheum rhabarbarum, rhubarb
 Rumex acetosa, sorrel
 Rumex scutatus, shield-leaf sorrel
 Sauropus androgynus, katuk
 Scorzonera hispanica, black salsify
 Sium sisarum, skirret
 Smallanthus sonchifolius, yacón
 Stachys affinis, crosne
 Suaeda pulvinata, seepweed
 Toona sinensis, fragrant spring tree or xiāngchūn
 Vasconcellea × heilbornii, babaco papaya

See also 
 Leaf vegetable
 Root vegetable
 Breadfruit is an example of a tree fruit that is perennial, and is used as a vegetable
 Perennial (disambiguation)

Further reading 
Alison Tindale. 2015. "Perennial Vegetables". backyardlarder.co.uk.
Eric Toensmeier. Perennial Vegetables: From Artichokes to Zuiki Taro, A Gardener's Guide to Over 100 Delicious, Easy-to-Grow Edibles. Chelsea Green, 2007. 
Simon Hickmott. Growing Unusual Vegetables: Weird And Wonderful Vegetables And How to Grow Them. Eco-Logic Books, 2006. 
Ken Fern. Plants for a Future: Edible & Useful Plants for a Healthier World. Permanent Publications, 2000.

References